Mahfouz Marei Mubarak bin Mahfouz, Lord of Abernethy  (born 14 December 1969) is a Saudi Arabian businessman living in the United Kingdom. Mahfouz is the executive officer of Saudi-based Marei bin Mahfouz Group, founded by his father Sheikh Marei Mubarak Mahfouz bin Mahfouz who is one of the richest men in Saudi Arabia. He is the holder of the Lordship and Barony of Abernethy in Scotland.

Biography 
Mahfouz holds a law degree from King Abdulaziz University, and a Master of Laws from the American University of London.

He was awarded Knight Grand Cross in the Companionate of Merit of the Military and Hospitaller Order of St Lazarus of Jerusalem (GCMLJ) in June 2013. He was made Foundation Fellow at Pembroke College, Oxford, and was made inaugural Bredon Fellow of Wolfson College, Cambridge in July 2013. The Mahfouz Building at Pembroke College, Oxford was named after him, as was the HE Dr Mahfouz bin Mahfouz Room in the Chancellor's Centre at Wolfson College, Cambridge. He was admitted to the Freedom of the City of London in December 2013. He was a Vice-President of the British Forces Foundation.

In November 2015, then Foreign Secretary Philip Hammond was criticised for accepting a watch worth £1,950 from Mahfouz. The watch was given as a gift after the unveiling of a statue of the Queen to mark the 800th anniversary of the sealing of Magna Carta. Ministers are not allowed to accept gifts worth more than £140 but Hammond claimed he was advised that the event was a constituency one, not a ministerial one, and therefore the rules for ministers did not apply to him on that day.

Cash-for-honours allegations
 
The Mahfouz Fountain and Garden at Dumfries House was named after him, and was opened by Prince Charles on 21 October 2014. In 2015 it was revealed that a wooded area near the Castle of Mey had been renamed Mahfouz Wood in honour of Mahfouz who reportedly donated £370,000 to its restoration. He is an Ambassador and Community Patron for The Prince's Foundation. Mahfouz met Prince Harry in 2013 and 2014 and donated £50,000 to his charity Sentebale and £10,000 to Walking With The Wounded, of which Harry is patron. Harry stated in 2021 that he severed ties with him in 2015 after expressing "growing concerns" about his motives, though aides from his father's household denied having any discussions with him regarding Mahfouz.

He was awarded an honorary CBE in 2016 "for services to charities in the UK". It is claimed that Michael Fawcett fixed the CBE for Mahfouz who donated more than £1.5 million to royal charities. Prince Charles gave Mahfouz his CBE at a private ceremony in the Blue Drawing Room at Buckingham Palace in November 2016, though the event was not published in the Court Circular.

In 2017, Fawcett expressed in correspondence a willingness to see Mahfouz's honour upgraded to a KBE and to support and contribute to his application for citizenship. In reaction to the story, former Liberal Democrat MP Norman Baker wrote to Metropolitan Police Commissioner Cressida Dick urging a police inquiry. In February 2022 the Metropolitan Police launched an investigation into the cash-for-honours allegations linked to Charles' charity The Prince's Foundation.

Gallery

References

1969 births
Living people
King Abdulaziz University alumni
Fellows of Wolfson College, Cambridge
Fellows of Pembroke College, Oxford
Commanders of the Order of the British Empire
Saudi Arabian businesspeople
People from Mecca
Saudi Arabian expatriates in the United Kingdom